Oliver Sutton may refer to:

 Oliver Sutton (bishop) (died 1299), medieval Bishop of Lincoln, England
 Oliver Sutton (RAF officer) (1896–1921), British World War I flying ace
 Sir Oliver Graham Sutton (1903–1977), British mathematician and meteorologist